Getsy is a surname. Notable people with the surname include:

Jason Getsy (1975-2009), American murderer
Luke Getsy (born 1984), American football coach and former quarterback